Maria Rita Soares de Andrade (3 April 1904 – April 1998) was a Brazilian lawyer and judge, who became Brazil's first female federal judge in 1967. She was also the first woman to enter the Order of Attorneys of Brazil (Portuguese: Ordem dos Advogados do Brasil).

Andrade was appointed to the bench in 1967, sitting in the fourth federal judicial division (Portuguese: 4ª Vara Federal) of Rio de Janeiro state, and served until her mandated retirement in April 1974. She also served as a state and federal prosecutor.

Andrade was born and grew up in Aracaju, attending public schools until university. She studied law at the Federal University of Bahia, graduating in 1926. She was the only woman in her class and the third to complete a law degree at the university.

Andrade was active in feminist causes while at university and shortly thereafter. She founded the Sergipe chapter of the Women's University Union (Portuguese: União Universitária Feminina), later known as the Brazilian Association of University Women (Portuguese: Associação Brasileira de Mulheres Universitárias).

Notes

References 
 

1904 births
1998 deaths
20th-century Brazilian judges
People from Aracaju
Federal University of Bahia alumni
Brazilian feminists
Brazilian women judges
20th-century Brazilian women
20th-century women judges